The South Africa women's national cricket team, nicknamed the Proteas, represents South Africa in international women's cricket. One of eight teams competing in the ICC Women's Championship (the highest level of the sport), the team is organised by Cricket South Africa (CSA), a full member of the International Cricket Council (ICC).

South Africa made its Test debut in 1960, against England, becoming the fourth team to play at that level (after Australia, England, and New Zealand). Because of the sporting boycott of South Africa and other factors, the team did not play any international fixtures between 1972 and 1997. South Africa returned to international competition in August 1997, in a One Day International (ODI) match against Ireland, and later in the year participated in the 1997 World Cup in India. The team has participated in every edition of the World Cup since then, and made the tournament semi-finals in 2000 and 2017. South Africa has likewise participated in every edition of the Women's World Twenty20, and made the semi-finals of the 2014 edition, played in Bangladesh.

History

Early history
The first report of women's cricket in South Africa is from 1888, when Harry Cadwallader, later the first secretary of South Africa Cricket Association, observed "a number of the fair sex indulging in practice... and they showed they are possessed of not inconsiderable talent...".  The following year, students from the South African College played against 'a team of ladies', with the male students forced to bat, bowl and field left-handed, and bat using pick-handles.  The women won the match by an innings.  There are other references to similar conditions being placed on male competitors in matches against women at the time, a tradition carried over from England.  Women's cricket was played in South Africa fairly regularly throughout the beginning of the 20th century, and in 1922, Winfred Kingswell set-up, and became the first president of, the Peninsula Girls' School Games Union.  Ten years later, she helped found the Peninsula Ladies Cricket Club (PLCC), which with 30 members, played regular matches against men's sides on level terms.  They played 33 matches in two seasons with limited success, winning nine of them.  In 1934, the PLCC affiliated to the Women's Cricket Association in England, which governed international cricket at the time.  The intention was to organise women's cricket in South Africa, and eventually send teams to play in England, Scotland and Australia.  Little progress was reported, although regular women's cricket continued until the Second World War.  It was revived in 1947 by a group of enthusiasts, and in 1951 Netta Rheinberg, on behalf of the Women's Cricket Association, suggested that a South Africa Women's Cricket Association be formed, and encouraged the possibility that a series of matches could be played between the two associations.  The South African & Rhodesian Women's Cricket Association (SA&RWCA) was officially formed in 1952.  At their annual general meeting in January 1955, the SA&RWCA accepted an invitation from the Women's Cricket Association to join an International Women's Cricket Council that, in addition to South Africa, included England, Australia and New Zealand. They also agreed that international matches would be played between the four nations.  In 1959, arrangements were made for the first international women's cricket tour of South Africa, as they would play host to the English team in 1960.

First international women's tours of South Africa

The touring English side played nine tour matches in addition to the scheduled four Test matches, beginning with a one-day contest against a Western Province Combined XI.  South Africa began their first women's Test match on 2 December 1960 at St George's Oval, Port Elizabeth — the same venue as used for the first men's Test match in the country in 1889 — and ended in a draw.  After another draw in the second Test, England claimed victory in the third by eight wickets, and a draw in the final Test gave the touring side a 1–0 series victory.  The series saw South Africa become the fourth women's Test playing nation, after England and Australia who contested the first ever women's Test match in 1934, and New Zealand who played their first women's Test in 1935.

Due to South African apartheid laws, which introduced legal racial segregation to the country in 1948, no non-white (defined under the legislation as either "black", "coloured" or "Indian") player was eligible to play Test cricket for South Africa.  In fact, overseas teams wishing to tour South Africa were also limited by these rules.  These laws led to Basil D'Oliveira, a 'Cape Coloured' South African emigrating to England, where he began to play Test cricket.  He was subsequently named as a late replacement as part of the England team to tour South African in 1968–69, but South African Prime Minister John Vorster refused to allow D'Oliveira into the country as part of the touring side, declaring: "We are not prepared to receive a team thrust upon us by people whose interests are not in the game but to gain certain political objectives which they do not even attempt to hide. The MCC team is not the team of the MCC but of the anti-apartheid movement."  A week later, the Marylebone Cricket Club (MCC) called off the tour.  South Africa's cricket team toured Australia the following winter, but a tour of England in 1970, and of Australia in 1971–72 were both cancelled after anti-apartheid protests.  Despite this growing sporting isolation, a New Zealand women's team toured South Africa in the 1971–72 season.  Only three members of the 1960 South Africa team returned to compete against New Zealand: Jennifer Gove, Lorna Ward and Maureen Payne.  New Zealand played six tour matches and three Test matches in a tour lasting just over a month spanning February and March 1972.  New Zealand won the series 1–0, with both the first and the last Tests being drawn.

Exclusion from international cricket

Although the D'Oliveira affair had drawn international condemnation, cricket administrators in England and Australia were reluctant to sever their playing links with South Africa.  Other international sports had already cut their ties with the country, exclusion from the 1964 and 1968 Olympics were followed by expulsion from the Olympic Movement in 1970.  Later in the same year South African athletes were suspended from international competition by the International Amateur Athletics Federation.  The invitation for the South African men's tour of England was initially maintained, but threats of physical disruption to matches from anti-apartheid militants saw the British government step-in to cancel the tour.  In May 1970, the Cricket Council made the decision that there should be no further tours to and from South Africa until cricket within the country was played on a multi-racial basis, and the national team was selected purely on merit.  In 1976, three different organisations; the South Africa Cricket Association (SACA), South African Board of Cricket Control (SACBOC) and the South African African Cricket Board (SAACB) agreed to establish one single board to govern South African cricket, and that all future cricket in the country would be played on an integrated basis regardless of race or colour.  The new governing body; the South African Cricket Union formally took over the running of cricket in the republic in September 1977.  However, a group within the SACBOC did not recognise this body, and set up a rival organisation, the South African Cricket Board, led by Hassan Howa, who claimed that there could be "no normal sport in an abnormal society".  The International Cricket Conference (ICC) imposed a moratorium on tours in 1970.  Despite the official boycott, cricket tours of South Africa did continue.  Derrick Robins took teams in 1973, 1974 and 1975, while an 'International Wanderers' side also toured in 1976.

In 1977, heads of state of the Commonwealth of Nations met to discuss the situation with apartheid in South Africa and the consequences of maintaining sporting ties with the country.  They unanimously adopted the Gleneagles Agreement, which discouraged sporting contact and competition with organisations, teams and individuals from South Africa.  This agreement temporarily stopped cricketing tours of South Africa.  However, in 1982 the first of the rebel tours began.  Geoffrey Boycott and Graham Gooch lead an English XI in a month-long tour of three 'Test' matches and three 'One Day Internationals'.  The reaction in England and South Africa was severely polarised.  The English press and politicians alike were outraged; dubbing the touring part the 'Dirty Dozen'.  In South Africa, it was heralded by the government and white press as the return of international cricket.  The English rebels all received three-year bans from international cricket.  Sri Lanka toured during the following South African summer, and were followed by a team from the West Indies, who justified their actions by claiming they were showing white South Africa that black men were their equals.  However, they received life-bans from Caribbean cricket in 1983, and were ostracised in their own countries.  An Australian XI, led by former Test captain Kim Hughes toured twice in 1985/86 and 1986/87, while a second English XI, this time led by Mike Gatting represented the final rebel tour in 1990.  There were some women's rebel tours from England, although these attracted much less interest than those in the men's game.  Kim Price, who captained South African women between 1997 and 2000 following their return to international cricket, made her first appearances in the mid-1980s against these rebel teams.

Return to international cricket

In June 1991, the South African Cricket Union and the South African Cricket Board merged to form the United Cricket Board of South Africa (UCB).  The unification ended enforced racial separation, and only a month later, on 10 July 1991, South Africa was re-admitted as a full member of the ICC.  South Africa's men played their first match since their enforced absence in November 1991, a One Day International against India.  Just under six years later, and twenty five years after their home series against New Zealand, South Africa returned to international women's cricket with a tour of Ireland and England in 1997.  In addition to marking their return, the three-match women's One Day International (ODI) series against Ireland also represented South Africa's first taste of ODI cricket, as the first women's ODI had been played in 1973, during their exclusion. Despite their inexperience in the format, and the lack of international experience of their players—none of the team from the 1971–72 series remained—South Africa whitewashed Ireland 3–0.  South Africa fared less well as they progressed onto the English segment of their tour.  After narrowly beating England Under-23s women in a 50-over warm-up match, they fell to a 79-run loss in the first ODI.  They improved in the second ODI to beat the hosts by two wickets, but a seven wicket defeat in the third, followed by rain abandonments in the final two matches saw South Africa lose the series 2–1.

Later in that year, South Africa women competed in their first Women's Cricket World Cup.  South Africa qualified from the group stage courtesy of their third-place finish—behind Australia and England—and met hosts India in the quarter-finals.  Batting first, South Africa only managed to make 80, with Daleen Terblanche and Cindy Eksteen the sole South Africans to make a double figure score.  India reached their target in 28 overs, and progressed to the semi-finals at South Africa's expense.

Series losses in Australia, New Zealand and England

After a 1998 season without any international cricket for South Africa women, they toured Australia and New Zealand in 1998–99.  A three match ODI series against the world champions, Australia, resulted in a 2–0 defeat; the third match was abandoned without a ball being bowled.  South Africa struggled to compete in either match, suffering a 92-run loss followed by a 100-run loss.  The subsequent series in New Zealand brought further defeat; after losing both 50-over warm-up matches to New Zealand women's 'A' sides, South Africa were whitewashed in the ODI series, only managing scores of 82, 101 and 96 when batting.

South Africa were again on tour in 2000, returning once more to England, this time contesting a five-match ODI series.  Two warm-up matches against England women 'A' resulted in a narrow victory followed by a tie, not an auspicious start.  However, unlike their previous two ODI series, South Africa managed to win two matches, winning both the third and the fifth ODIs. Despite these victories England won the series 3–2, subjecting South Africa to their fourth straight series defeat.

Raising the profile of South African women's cricket
The 2000 Women's World Cup saw an improvement in form, as South Africa finished ahead of England in the group stage, courtesy of a five-wicket victory over them.  Their finish saw them qualify for the semi-finals, where they were beaten by Australia, who had remained undefeated in the group stage of the competition.  The achievement of South Africa's women raised publicity of the sport in their own country, where South African Women's Cricket Association president Colleen Roberts described the exposure of the women's game as "pathetic".  Roberts explained that one of the main problems surrounding the promotion of the sport was the lack of teams touring South Africa, due to women's cricket in the country having no sponsor.  South Africa did manage to attract a team to tour in 2001–02, with India travelling to the country to contest four ODIs and a Test match.  After winning the ODI series 2–1, South Africa were defeated by 10 wickets in their first Test since their readmittance to international cricket.

South Africa then played three consecutive series against England women, touring the country in 2003, and then hosting series in both 2003–04 and 2004–05.  The 2003 series saw the two nations compete in two Test matches in addition to three ODIs.  After a series of tour matches against county and representative sides in which South Africa mustered only one win in four attempts, the first Test match was drawn.  The ODI series was scheduled before the second Test, and South Africa won the second of the limited over contests, but suffered big defeats in both of the matches either side.  The tour finished with another heavy loss in the second Test, England winning by an innings and 96 runs as South Africa only managed to score 130 and 229.  In 2003–04, South Africa began the series with a final-ball victory in the first ODI, but lost all the remaining ODIs to lose the series 4–1.  In 2004–05 the sides played two ODIs in the weeks leading up to the 2005 Women's Cricket World Cup which was being held in South Africa, two years after they had hosted the men's competition.  South Africa lost both matches, and went on to have an unsuccessful tournament; in seven matches (of which one was abandoned and one had no result) South Africa only managed one victory; against West Indies.  They finished the World Cup in seventh, and were eliminated.  Following their elimination they hastily arranged a three-match ODI series against the West Indies, who had also been knocked out of the competition.

Late 2000s
Pakistan toured South Africa in 2007, a series that South Africa won 4–0, with no result.  They then toured England and Netherlands.  They won all their matches in the 2008 Women's Cricket World Cup Qualifier, beating Pakistan by 8 wickets in the final, and securing their place in the 2009 Women's Cricket World Cup.

Governing body
Before 1952, women's cricket in South Africa was for the most part ungoverned.  In 1952, following advice from the Women's Cricket Association, the South Africa & Rhodesian Women's Cricket Association (SA&RWCA) was formed to administrate and organise the running of women's cricket in the country.  During the years of isolation in the 1970s and 1980s, women's cricket was strong in South Africa, but with a lack of international competition, the game and governing body became defunct.  The game was rejuvenated by the United Cricket Board of South Africa in 1995, when they ran a successful Women's/Girls' Tournament, and the South Africa Women's Cricket Association was formed.

Tournament history

Women's World Cup
 1973 to 1993: Did not participate
 1997: Quarterfinals
 2000: Semifinals
 2005: 7th place
 2009: 7th place
 2013: 6th place
 2017: Semifinals
 2022: Semifinals (3rd place)

ICC Women's World Twenty20
 2009: Group stage
 2010: Group stage
 2012: Group stage
 2014: Semifinals
 2016: Group stage
 2018: Group stage
 2020: Semifinals
 2023: Runners-up

ICC Women's Championship
 2014–16: 5th place
 2017–20: 3rd place

Women's World Cup Qualifier
 2008: Won
 2011: 4th place
 2017: 2nd place

ICC Women's Cricket Challenge (ODI)
 2010: Won

ICC Women's Cricket Challenge (Twenty20)
 2010: 3rd place

Honours
Women's T20 World Cup:
 Runners-up (1): 2023

Players

Current squad
This lists all the players who are centrally contracted with Cricket South Africa or was named in a recent squad. Updated on 1 July 2022.

Centrally contracted players are listed in bold.

Former players

National captains

Records

Test cricket
Despite being the oldest, and originally only, form of cricket played by women internationally, South Africa have played just thirteen Test matches (over half of them against England), with the most recent Test being played against England in 2022. Twenty20 cricket has taken on a far more prominent and lucrative role, almost eliminating Test cricket from the women's game altogether.

Result summary

Individual records

Most matches

Most runs

High scores

Most wickets

Best bowling figures in an innings

ODI cricket

Result summary

Individual records

Most matches

Most runs

High scores

Most wickets

Best bowling figures in an innings

Twenty20 International cricket

Result summary

Individual records

Most matches

Most runs

High scores

Most wickets

Best bowling figures in an innings

1 Included a hat-trick.

See also
 South African men's cricket team
 List of South Africa women ODI cricketers
 List of South Africa women Twenty20 International cricketers

References

Bibliography
 
 
 
 
 

 
Women's national cricket teams
Women's cricket in South Africa
Cricket teams in South Africa